Salem Harchèche (born July 24, 1972) is a retired Algerian international footballer who played as a defender.

Harcheche spent most of his career in France and played for Saint-Étienne where he played in 73 Ligue 1 matches. He also played for Martigues and Caen in Ligue 2.

Harcheche made several appearances for the Algeria national football team, including three matches at the 1998 African Nations Cup finals.

References

1972 births
Living people
Association football defenders
Algerian footballers
Algeria international footballers
1998 African Cup of Nations players
French footballers
French sportspeople of Algerian descent
Footballers from Marseille
CR Belouizdad players
AS Saint-Étienne players
FC Martigues players
Stade Malherbe Caen players
Ligue 1 players